Francesco Wirz (born 19 November 1967) is an Italian windsurfer. He competed in the Division II event at the 1988 Summer Olympics.

References

External links
 
 

1967 births
Living people
Italian windsurfers
Italian male sailors (sport)
Olympic sailors of Italy
Sailors at the 1988 Summer Olympics – Division II
Sportspeople from Bergamo